Plagiogramma is a genus of clown beetles in the family Histeridae. There are more than 30 described species in Plagiogramma.

Species
These 32 species belong to the genus Plagiogramma:

 Plagiogramma arciger (Marseul, 1854)
 Plagiogramma brasiliense Tarsia in Curia, 1935
 Plagiogramma caviscuta (Marseul, 1861)
 Plagiogramma coproides (Marseul, 1855)
 Plagiogramma darlingtoni (Wenzel, 1944)
 Plagiogramma epulo (Marseul, 1870)
 Plagiogramma fissus (Marseul, 1861)
 Plagiogramma fornicata (Marseul, 1887)
 Plagiogramma frater (Marseul, 1855)
 Plagiogramma frontale (Kirsch, 1866)
 Plagiogramma glabra (Bickhardt, 1911)
 Plagiogramma guyanense (Mazur, 1974)
 Plagiogramma hastata (Marseul, 1855)
 Plagiogramma incas (Marseul, 1855)
 Plagiogramma intermedia (Marseul, 1855)
 Plagiogramma leleupae (Wenzel, 1976)
 Plagiogramma lucens (Marseul, 1855)
 Plagiogramma marseulii (Kirsch, 1873)
 Plagiogramma mundus (Erichson, 1834)
 Plagiogramma nitescens (Marseul, 1861)
 Plagiogramma paradoxa Mazur, 1988
 Plagiogramma patruelis (Lewis, 1888)
 Plagiogramma peruana (Schmidt, 1889)
 Plagiogramma pubifrons (Hinton, 1935)
 Plagiogramma rhinocera (Marseul, 1870)
 Plagiogramma schmidti (Wenzel & Dybas, 1941)
 Plagiogramma singulistria (Hinton, 1935)
 Plagiogramma sphaerula (Marseul, 1870)
 Plagiogramma striatipyga (Wenzel, 1944)
 Plagiogramma subtropica (Casey, 1893)
 Plagiogramma tersus (Erichson, 1834)
 Plagiogramma trux (Marseul, 1861)

References

Further reading

 
 

Histeridae
Articles created by Qbugbot